Luau MTV: Nando Reis & Os Infernais is the second live album released by Brazilian band Nando Reis & Os Infernais, released on CD and DVD in 2007 through Universal Music. The album features a number of special participations: Andréa Martins (Canto dos Malditos na Terra do Nunca), Negra Li, Andreas Kisser (Sepultura), and Samuel Rosa (Skank). The song "Sou Dela" reached #10 at the Brazilian Top-40 Charts.

Track listing 
Sou Dela
A Letra "A"
Relicário
A Minha Gratidão é Uma Pessoa
As Coisas tão Mais Lindas
Luz dos Olhos
N
Espatódea
A Fila
Negra Livre
Bom Dia
Quem Vai Dizer Tchau?
Tentei Fugir
Sua Impossível Chance
Monóico
Eu e a Felicidade
Resposta
Por Onde Andei
Mantra (DVD bonus track)
O Segundo Sol (DVD bonus track)

Personnel

Os Infernais 
Nando Reis: lead vocals, acoustic guitar
Carlos Pontual: acoustic guitar, twelve-string guitar, backing vocals
Alex Veley: keyboards, backing vocals
Felipe Cambraia: acoustic bass guitar
Diogo Gameiro: drums, backing vocals

Guest musicians 
Lan Lan: percussion
Juju Gomes: backing vocals
Micheline Cardoso: backing vocals

References

External links 
 

Nando Reis e os Infernais albums
2007 live albums